David Rosenmann-Taub (born May 3, 1927 in Santiago) is a Chilean poet, musician, and artist.  His precocious talent in both literature and music was recognized and encouraged by his father, a polyglot, and his mother, a virtuoso pianist.  She began teaching him the instrument when he was two; by nine, he himself was giving piano lessons. He later studied composition, counterpoint, and fugue with the celebrated composer Pedro Humberto Allende. He began writing poetry at a very early age; his first published work, a long poem titled El Adolescente (“The Adolescent”), was written at age fourteen and appeared four years later in a literary magazine.

	He graduated from the University of Chile in 1948. That same year he won the Sindicato de Escritores prize for his first book of poetry, Cortejo y Epinicio (Cortege and Epinicion), which received a reputation-making review from the preeminent literary critic of Chile, Hernán Díaz Arrieta (known as “Alone”).  In the three decades that followed, Rosenmann-Taub published more than ten volumes of poetry, including Los Surcos Inundados (The Flooded Furrows),  La Enredadera del Júbilo (The Vine of Jubilance), Los Despojos del Sol (The Spoils of the Sun), and El Cielo en la Fuente (The Sky in the Fountain).  For Los Surcos Inundados, he received the Premio Municipal de Poesía, the Chilean equivalent of the Pulitzer Prize.  His poetry has been admired by authors as disparate as Witold Gombrowicz, Victoria Ocampo, and Francis de Miomandre.

In 1976, he began to travel, lecturing on poetry, music, and aesthetics in Latin America, Europe, and the United States, where he settled in 1985. Since 2002 his writings have been published in Chile, along with reissues of his older works. Armando Uribe, the 2004 winner of Chile's Premio Nacional, described Rosenmann-Taub as “the most important and profound living poet of the entire Spanish language.”

Poetry
Cortejo y Epinicio (Cruz del Sur, 1948)
Los Surcos Inundados (Cruz del Sur, 1951)
La Enredadera del Júbilo (Cruz del Sur, 1952)
Los Despojos del Sol (Esteoeste, 1976)
Al Rey Su Trono (Esteoeste, 1983)
Cortejo y Epinicio (LOM, 2002), 
El Mensajero (LOM, 2003), 
El Cielo en la Fuente/La Mañana Eterna (LOM, 2004), 
País Más Allá (LOM, 2004), 
Poesiectomía (LOM, 2005), 
En un lugar de la Sangre (Mandora, 2006),  
Los Despojos del Sol (LOM, 2006), 
Auge (LOM, 2007), 
Quince (LOM, 2008), 
La Opción (LOM, 2011), 
La noche antes (LOM, 2013), 
El Zócalo (LOM, 2013), 
Cortejo y Epinicio: la tetralogía (LOM, 2013), 
Los Surcos Inundados (LOM, 2014), 
Oó,o (Pre-Textos, 2015), 
Trébol de Nueve (LOM, 2016), 
Alm-ería (Pre-Textos, 2017), 
Jornadas (LOM, 2018), 
Glosa (Mandora, 2020), 
Tílimtilín (LOM, 2021),

Anthologies
Me incitó el espejo (DVD, 2010), 
El horizonte cruza la casa (La Abeja de Perséfone, 2011), 
Multiverso (Mansalva, 2012), 
El duelo de la luz (Pre-Textos, 2014),

Translations
Quince (Bengali) (2010), 
E poi, il vento (Italian) (Andrea Lippolis, 2010), 
Cortège et Épinicie (French) (Bruno Doucey, 2011), 
Antes que a luz trema (Portuguese) (2013) 
Il Plinto (Italian) (Le Lettere, 2017),

Selected musical works
Dagger of Life (1994) - piano and synthesizer
En un lugar de la Sangre (1997) - piano
Fuegos naturales, I-III (1997) - piano solo, duet, trio and quartet
Sonatinas de amistad, I-IV (1997) - piano duet
Selecciones (2008) - piano and synthesizer
Conversaciones (2010) - piano
En un lugar de la Sangre (2013) - piano
Primavera sin fin (2018) - piano, bongo, and synthesizer

External links
davidrosenmann-taub.com
davidrosenmanntaub-music.com
davidrosenmanntaub-drawings.com
www.cervantesvirtual.com/bib_autor/rosenmann/
www.letras.s5.com/archivorosenmann.htm

1927 births
People from Santiago
Chilean Jews
Chilean people of Polish-Jewish descent
Chilean male poets
20th-century classical composers
Living people
Chilean composers
Chilean male composers
Chilean classical pianists
Male classical pianists
Male classical composers
20th-century Chilean poets
20th-century Chilean male writers
21st-century Chilean poets
21st-century Chilean male writers
21st-century classical pianists
20th-century male musicians
21st-century male musicians
Chilean artists
21st-century male artists